The Partouche Poker Tour (PPT) was a series of poker tournaments held at casinos owned and operated by the Partouche group in France. The tour operated on a three-tiered structure, with two levels of satellites eventually feeding into the Main Event held at the Palm Beach casino in Cannes.

Satellites with a €125 buy-in were held every Tuesday and Thursday from November to July, with winners earning a place in the next round of Super Satellites. Players could also have entered a Super Satellite directly for a €1,075 buy-in. Each of the six Super Satellites, held at a different Partouche casino, was limited to 500 entrants, with the top 50 finishers at each event earning entry to the Main Event.

The Main Event consisted of the 300 Super Satellite ticket winners, plus other players who pay the €8,500 buy-in. As of 2010, the Main Event was held in September, with the competitors playing until the nine-player final table is reached, at which point the tournament adjourns. In a format similar to that of the World Series of Poker Main Event, the final nine players returned in November to play until a champion was crowned.

In 2012, Patrick Partouche, CEO of the Partouche group, announced that the tour would not return in 2013.

Main Event results

2008

2009

2010

One of the players who had made the final table, German player Ali Tekintamgac, was disqualified from the tournament for cheating. This was not the first time he had been caught cheating; earlier in 2010 at the European Poker Tour stop in Tallinn, he was found to have used colleagues posing as bloggers and journalists to signal his opponents' hole cards.

The 2010 main event also sparked a controversy, after the tournament staff was accused of making dubious rulings in favor of local players. Danish poker pro Mickey "mement_mori" Petersen and American poker pro Michael Binger reported a hand featuring a French and an Italian pro player Mustapha Kanit, whereupon the floorman ruled in favor of the French player even though he had thrown his hand into the muck.

2011

2012

Notes and references

External links
Official site

Poker tournaments in Europe
Television shows about poker